"Going Home" is an instrumental song by American saxophonist Kenny G which was released in 1990, from the artist's first live album Kenny G Live. 

Originally recorded in April 1988 for Stevie Nicks' album The Other Side of the Mirror, as working title "Tragedy Of One's Own Soul" and also earlier for a song titled "Lily Girl", both with lyrics written by Stevie. The project was eventually dropped prior to the May 1989 release of her album. There are bootleg versions of both songs widely available online, since neither have ever been officially released by Kenny G. or Stevie Nicks.

Reception in China
This song is an unconventional mega-hit throughout the country of China. It has become the unofficial national closing anthem for food courts, outdoor markets, health clubs, shopping malls and train stations throughout the country. Many businesses begin piping the music over their loudspeakers shortly before closing at night. Television stations also play the song before ending their evening broadcasts. Some trains staffed by Nanchang Railway Bureau play the song when reaching their final destinations. Many Chinese, when asked, say they associate the song with the need to finish their activity and go home, although they may not even know the name of the song or its artist.

Kenny G has said that, when he played it midconcert in China, the audience got up and left early.

Charts

References

1990 singles
1980s instrumentals
Songs written by Walter Afanasieff
Kenny G songs
1989 songs
Arista Records singles